Jäje Johansson (born 11 October 1969), better known by his stage name Jay-Jay Johanson, is a Swedish-British singer-songwriter, known for his melancholic vocals. His music has integrated the trip hop genre until he switched his sound to a more electroclash-oriented direction with his 2002 album Antenna, which featured "On the Radio". After this album, he came back to his characteristic sound after he released The Long Term Physical Effects Are Not Yet Known in 2007.

Biography
Jay-Jay Johanson was born Jäje Johansson on 11 October 1969 in Trollhättan, Västra Götaland. His debut album, Whiskey, was released in August 1996. Recorded at Break My Heart Studios in the Stockholm archipelago, the album was characterized by its jazzy vocals over trippy, film noir arrangements.

In 1998, Johanson released Tattoo, taking a step into a more richly textured, poetic ambience. Johansson's third album, Poison, was released in April 2000 and went straight into the French charts at number four. The album featured contributions from Cocteau Twins founder and guitarist Robin Guthrie. The same year Johanson also composed the soundtrack to French director Ilan Duran Cohen's film La Confusion des Genres, and in 2001, Johanson emerged with "Cosmodrome", a sound-and-image installation first exhibited in the French city of Dijon. This art-piece has travelled around the world and was last shown at the Musée d'Art Moderne de la Ville de Paris.

Antenna was released in 2002, recorded with assistance from German experimental electronic group Funkstörung. 2004 marked the release of the compilation Prologue, meant for the American market. It was followed by Rush in 2005, an album partly produced by French producer Jean-Pierre Ensuque.

Johanson co-wrote and contributed vocals to The Knife's 2006 song "Marble House". In the spring of 2006, he called together the musicians he had worked with on the three first albums, and January 2007 saw the release of their collaborative effort The Long Term Physical Effects Are Not Yet Known. A tour in promotion of the album kicked off in China and continued to more than thirty cities around the world.

Johanson's eighth studio album Spellbound was released on 2 May 2011. "Dilemma" was released as the album's lead single on 11 March 2011.

On 3 March 2017, "You'll Miss Me When I'm Gone" was released via iTunes as the first single from Johanson's upcoming album Bury The Hatchet, due 15 September 2017 on 29 Music.

Discography

Studio albums

Compilation albums
 Prologue: Best of the Early Years 1996–2002 (2004)
 3 Original Album Classics (2009)
 Best of 1996 - 2013 (2013)

Soundtrack albums
 La Confusion des Genres (2000)
 La Troisième Partie du Monde (2008)

Singles

Documentary
 Jay Jay Johanson by Michel Viotte (1999)

References

External links
 

1969 births
Intelligent dance musicians
Living people
People from Trollhättan
Swedish electronic musicians
Swedish male singer-songwriters
Swedish singer-songwriters
English-language singers from Sweden
Synth-pop singers
Trip hop musicians
Universal Music Group artists
Melodifestivalen contestants of 2013